The 1896 Grand National was the 58th renewal of the Grand National horse race that took place at Aintree near Liverpool, England, on 27 March 1896.

Winning jockey David Campbell owned The Soarer until a few weeks before the race when he sold him to
Hall Walker.

Finishing Order

Non-finishers

References

 1896
Grand National
Grand National
19th century in Lancashire